Agiripalli mandal is one of the 28 mandals in Eluru district of the Indian state of Andhra Pradesh. It is under the administration of Nuzvid revenue division, with headquarters at Agiripalli. The mandal is bounded by Vijayawada (rural), Gannavaram, Bapulapadu, Nuzvid, Mylavaram and G.Konduru mandals.

Administration 
The mandal is partially a part of the Andhra Pradesh Capital Region under the jurisdiction of the Andhra Pradesh Capital Region Development Authority.

Settlements 
Agiripalli mandal consists of 25 villages. The following are the list of villages in the mandal:

Notes
(†) Mandal headquarter

References

Mandals in Eluru district